News Corp Australia is an Australian media conglomerate and wholly owned subsidiary of the American News Corp. News Corp Australia employs more than 8,000 staff nationwide and approximately 3,000 journalists however News Corp Australia has closed approximately 100 newspapers and cut approximately 500 jobs in Australia since 2019. 

The group's interests span newspaper and magazine publishing, Internet, subscription television in the form of Foxtel, market research, DVD and film distribution, and film and television production trading assets. News Pty Limited (formerly News Limited) is the holding company of the group.

News Corp Australia owns approximately 142 daily, Sunday, weekly, bi-weekly, and tri-weekly newspapers, of which 102 are suburban publications (including 16 in which News Corp Australia has a 50% interest). News Corp Australia publishes a nationally distributed newspaper in Australia, a metropolitan newspaper in each of the Australian cities of Adelaide, Brisbane, Darwin, Hobart, Melbourne, and Sydney, as well as groups of suburban newspapers in the suburbs of Adelaide, Brisbane, Melbourne, Perth, and Sydney. The company publishes a further thirty magazine titles across Australia. According to the Finkelstein Review of Media and Media Regulation, in 2011 the group accounted for 23% of the newspaper titles in Australia.

With interests in digital media, the company's sites include news.com.au, Business Spectator and Eureka Report, Kidspot.com.au, taste.com.au and homelife.com.au. It has a 55% stake in carsguide.com.au which was sold in 2016, a share in REA Group that operates www.realestate.com.au, as well as websites for most newspaper and magazine titles. The company's other Australian assets include Australian News Channel, 65% ownership of subscription television provider Foxtel, (which in turn owns Fox Sports Australia) and shares in the Brisbane Broncos NRL team.

Until the formation of News Corporation in 1979, News Limited was the principal holding company for the business interests of Rupert Murdoch and his family. Since then, News Limited had been wholly owned by News Corporation. In 2004, News Corporation announced its intention to reincorporate to the United States. On 3 November News Corp Limited ceased trading on the Australian Stock Exchange; and on 8 November, News Corporation began trading on the New York Stock Exchange. On 28 June 2013, News Corporation was split into two separate companies. Murdoch's newspaper interests became News Corp, which was the new parent company of News Limited. The group adopted the new News Corp Australia name following the listing of the new News Corp on 1 July 2013.

History

Early days
News Limited was established in 1923 by James Edward Davidson and funded by the Collins Group mining empire for the purpose of publishing anti-union propaganda, when he purchased the Broken Hill Barrier Miner and the Port Pirie Recorder. He went on to purchase Adelaide's weekly Mail and to found The News, a daily newspaper in Adelaide, South Australia.

Murdochs
Sir Keith Murdoch acquired a minority interest in the company in 1949. Following his death in 1952, his son Rupert Murdoch inherited The News, which has been described by Murdoch biographer Bruce Page as the "foundation stone" of News Limited (and News Corporation).

Over the next few years, Murdoch gradually established himself as one of the most dynamic media proprietors in Australia, quickly expanding his holdings by acquiring a string of daily and suburban newspapers in most capital cities, including the Sydney afternoon paper, The Daily Mirror, as well as a small Sydney-based recording company, Festival Records. His acquisition of the Mirror proved crucial to his success, allowing him to challenge the dominance of his two main rivals in the Sydney market, the Fairfax Newspapers group, which published the hugely profitable The Sydney Morning Herald, and the Consolidated Press group, owned by Sir Frank Packer, which published the city's leading tabloid paper, The Daily Telegraph.

In 1964, News Limited made its next important advance when it established The Australian, Australia's first national daily newspaper, based initially in Canberra and later in Sydney. The Australian, a broadsheet, gave News Limited a new respectability as a quality newspaper publisher, and also greater political influence since The Australian has always had an elite readership, if not always a large circulation.

Also in 1964, News Limited made Rupert Murdoch's first overseas newspaper investment – a 29.57 percent stake in the Wellington Publishing Company, subsequently part of Independent Newspapers Limited, INL, New Zealand's largest publishing group. The News Limited holding in INL fluctuated over the years and was just over 49 percent in 1997. The INL business was bought by News Limited's main rival in 2003 – Fairfax Media.

Over the next ten years, as his press empire grew, Murdoch established a hugely lucrative financial base, and these profits were routinely used to subsidise further acquisitions. In his early years of newspaper ownership Murdoch was an aggressive, micromanaging entrepreneur. His standard tactic was to buy loss-making Australian newspapers and turn them around by introducing radical management and editorial changes and fighting no-holds-barred circulation wars with his competitors. By the 1970s, this power base was so strong that Murdoch was able to acquire leading newspapers and magazines in both London and New York, as well as many other media holdings.

To gain subscriptions for its new pay television business, News Ltd recruited rugby league football administrators, clubs and players to form a new competition, sparking the mid-1990s Super League war.

On 12 July 2006, News Limited announced the creation of a new division, News Digital Media, to manage the operations of the news site news.com.au; the online marketplace sites, carsguide.com.au, truelocal.com.au and careerone.com.au as well as the partly owned realestate.com.au, foxsports.com.au and related activities involving Foxtel and the company's newspapers and the Australian versions of Fox Interactive Media sites Myspace and IGN. Chairman and chief executive of News Limited, John Hartigan, announced the appointment of Richard Freudenstein as chief executive of the division.

In February 2018, News Corp Australia announced a partnership with Taboola to launch an integrated native content creation, booking and distribution platform. The Taboola Feed will be implemented on desktop, mobile, web and in-app across the News Corp Australia digital network.

Editorial conduct issues
In the wake of the News International phone hacking scandal in the United Kingdom, in July 2011 News Limited announced a review of all payments in the previous three years. On 22 July it was reported that two retired Victorian Supreme Court judges, Frank Vincent AO QC and Bernard Teague AO, were appointed to act as independent assessors of the conduct of the review and also assess the outcome. The editorial and financial review concluded in early November and found no evidence of phone hacking or payments to public officials, with Vincent and Teague declaring that the review process did not bring ".....to light any systemic issues with respect to the making of payments to third parties and any substantial amounts paid to individuals in respect of illegitimate activities."

Despite this the Australian division of News Corp has not entirely escaped scandal with allegations in 2012 that News Corp subsidiary, News Datacom Systems (NDS) had used hackers to undermine pay TV rivals around the world, including Australia. Some of the victims of the alleged hacking, such as Austar were later taken over by News Corp and others such as Ondigital later went bust. NDS had originally been set up to provide security to News Corp's pay TV interests but emails obtained by Fairfax Media revealed they had also pursued a wider agenda by distributing the keys to rival set top box operators and seeking to obtain phone records of suspected rivals. The emails were from the hard drive of NDS European chief, Ray Adams. It was also revealed that Australian Federal police were working with UK police to investigate hacking by News Corp.

Corporate changes
In 2000  John Hartigan was appointed Chief Executive Officer, replacing Lachlan Murdoch. and added chairman to his role in 2005. During his time in the roles, he presided over a number of controversies, included Eatock v Bolt, the court case following News Ltd journalist Andrew Bolt breaching the Racial Discrimination Act, and an unfair dismissal case brought by former Herald Sun editor Bruce Guthrie. On 30 November 2011, Hartigan left News Ltd, and owner Rupert Murdoch took on the role of chairman, while former Foxtel executive Kim Williams took on the role of CEO.

On 28 June 2013, News Corporation split into two publicly traded companies focused on publishing, and broadcasting/media respectively. At this time News Limited was renamed News Corp Australia and became part of the publishing company, News Corp, with Wall Street Journal editor Robert Thomson replacing Rupert Murdoch as CEO. Murdoch remained a chairman and major shareholder for both companies.

On 9 August 2013 it was announced that Julian Clarke would replace Kim Williams as the CEO of News Corp Australia.

On 9 June 2015, it was announced that Peter Tonagh would replace Julian Clarke as the CEO, with Michael Miller to be appointed to the role of Executive Chairman. Peter Tonagh and Michael Miller's first day in their new roles was 16 November 2015

Influence in Australia
Murdoch's desire for dominant cross-media ownership manifested in early 1961 when he bought an ailing Australian record label, Festival Records, and within a few years it had become the leading local recording company . He also bought a television station in Wollongong, New South Wales, hoping to use it to break into the Sydney television market, but found himself frustrated by Australia's cross-media ownership laws, which prevented him from owning both a major newspaper and television station in the same city. Since then he has consistently lobbied, both personally and through his papers, to have these laws changed in his favour. This occurred in 2006 when the Liberal-National Coalition Government, having gained control of both houses of the Australian Parliament, introduced reforms to cross-media ownership and foreign media ownership laws. The laws came into effect in early 2007, with further changes in 2017 abolishing 'two out of three' restrictions that had previously prevented news companies from owning newspaper, radio, and television services within the same city.

News Corp Australia has nearly three-quarters of daily metropolitan newspaper circulation and so maintains great influence in Australia. Internal News Corp Australia documents reveal a brazen offer during the 2001 federal election campaign to promote the policies of the Liberal National Party (LNP) in its best-selling newspapers nationwide for almost A$500,000. Other documents include a marginal seats guide written by a senior business manager for internal use. It evidences a corporate strategy to target marginal seats at the 2004 election. Some of the documents appeared on Media Watch.

Murdoch wanted a way to influence politics in his native land. He saw a way to do that through the News Corp publication The Australian. The national daily has been used to support Murdoch's political interests over time, such as John McEwen with the National Party of Australia and Gough Whitlam with the Australian Labor Party.

A parliamentary petition initiated by former Prime Minister Kevin Rudd for a Royal Commission investigating the diversity and integrity of print media, focused primarily on News Corp, raised more than 500,000 signatures in November 2020.

Acquisitions

Britain
Murdoch moved to Britain and rapidly became a major force there after his acquisitions of the News of the World, and The Sun in 1969 and The Times and The Sunday Times in 1981, which he bought from the Thomson family. Both takeovers further reinforced his growing reputation as a ruthless and cunning business operator. His takeover of The Times aroused great hostility among traditionalists, who feared he would take it "downmarket." This led directly to the founding of The Independent in 1986 as an alternative quality daily.

United States
Murdoch made his first acquisition in the United States in 1973, when he purchased the San Antonio News. Soon afterwards he founded the National Star, a supermarket tabloid, and in 1976 he purchased the New York Post. Subsequent acquisitions were undertaken through News Corporation.

Australia
News Limited expanded its newspaper holdings in 1987 when it acquired The Herald and Weekly Times, which published two newspapers in Melbourne (in 1990 these papers would be combined to form the Herald Sun) as well as large stakes in several other newspaper publishers. News Limited went on to acquire the remaining shares of Brisbane's Queensland Newspapers (owner of The Courier-Mail), Adelaide's Advertiser Newspapers (owner of The Advertiser) and Hobart's Davies Brothers (owner of The Mercury).

In 1991, News Limited spun off its longtime magazine house, Southdown Press, as Pacific Magazines and Printing, and sold the former Advertiser magazines, renamed Murdoch Magazines, to Matt Handbury. News Limited re-entered the magazine market in 2000 with the start of News Magazines. In 2006, News Limited returned to being a major player in the Australian magazine business with the purchase of Independent Print Media Group's FPC Magazines (Delicious, Super Food Ideas, Vogue Australia).

Nationwide News is a subsidiary of News Corp Australia. It was involved in Nationwide News Pty Ltd v Wills in the High Court of Australia in 1992. In 2018 it was ordered by the Federal Court to pay damages to actor Geoffrey Rush after The Daily Telegraph published a front-page article alleging that Rush engaged in "inappropriate behaviour" on stage with actress Eryn Jean Norvill during the Sydney Theatre Company's 2015 production of King Lear.

Holdings
News Corp Australia operates 170 newspaper and magazine titles in Australia, including the following:

Newspapers

National
The Australian including weekly insert magazine The Deal and monthly insert magazine (wish)
The Weekend Australian including insert magazine The Weekend Australian Magazine

Metropolitan
New South Wales
 The Daily Telegraph
 The Sunday Telegraph including insert magazine sundaymagazine
 mX (Sydney) (ceased publication 12 June 2015)
 The Sportsman

Victoria
 Herald Sun
 Sunday Herald Sun including insert magazine sundaymagazine
 mX (Melbourne) (ceased publication 12 June 2015)

Queensland
 The Courier-Mail including weekly insert magazine QWeekend
 The Sunday Mail
  The Daily Sun (1982–1988), from 1988 The Sun, now ceased publication
 The Gold Coast Bulletin
 mX (Brisbane) (ceased publication 12 June 2015)

South Australia
 The Advertiser including the monthly insert the Adelaide* magazine
 Sunday Mail
 Messenger Newspapers, formerly including (now all defunct - some online presence within The Advertiser website)
 Eastern Courier Messenger
 Leader Messenger
 City North Messenger
 East Torrens Messenger
 Mitcham & Hills Messenger
 The City

Tasmania
 The Mercury
 The Sunday Tasmanian

Northern Territory
 Northern Territory News
 The Sunday Territorian

Community
Sydney
 NewsLocal (formerly Cumberland-Courier Community Newspapers)
 Inner West Courier
 North Shore Times
 The Manly Daily
 Central Coast Express Advocate

Melbourne
 Leader Community Newspapers

Brisbane
 Quest Community Newspapers

Adelaide
 Messenger Newspapers

Regional
New South Wales
Tweed Daily News
Coffs Coast Advocate

South Australia
 Messenger Newspapers, including:
 Northern Times Messenger
 Weekly Times Messenger
 Southern Times Messenger
 Portside Messenger

Tasmania
 Tasmanian Country

Victoria
 Geelong Advertiser
 Geelong News

Queensland
 Gold Coast Bulletin
 Townsville Bulletin
 Tablelander
 Innisfail Advocate
 Burdekin Advocate
 The Northern Miner
 Herbert River Express
 The Cairns Post
 Tablelands Advertiser
 The Daily Mercury
 Central Queensland News
 The Morning Bulletin
 Central Telegraph
 The Observer
 NewsMail
 Fraser Coast Chronicle
 The Gympie Times
 The Sunshine Coast Daily
 The Queensland Times
 The Chronicle
 Warwick Daily News
 The Dalby Herald
 Chinchilla News and Murilla Advertiser
 The Western Star

Magazines
 GQ Australia
 Vogue Australia
 Vogue Living
 Australian Golf Digest
 Super Food Ideas
 Delicious magazine
 Big League
 Taste.com.au Magazine

Websites
News.com.au publishes stories and multimedia created by a team of about 51 reporters. 
The Punch was an opinion and news website, founded in 2009 and merged with news.com.au in March 2013
Business Spectator is a business news website
Punters.com.au, an Australian horse racing news and form guide website
Racenet.com.au, Australia's Premier Horse Racing News, Form Guides & Tips
KidSpot, a parenting website
Realestate.com.au, Buy, rent and sell property

Gambling
Betr (33%)

Sport
 Brisbane Broncos (69%)

Television
 Foxtel (65% with Telstra)
 Fox Sports
 Streamotion
 Sky News Australia (through Australian News Channel)
 Sky News Extra (through Australian News Channel)
 Sky News Weather Channel (through Australian News Channel)

See also 
 Journalism in Australia
 List of NRL club owners

References

External links 
 News Corp Australia official website

 
News Corporation subsidiaries
Mass media companies of Australia
Holding companies of Australia
Companies based in Adelaide
Holding companies established in 1923
Publishing companies established in 1923
Australian companies established in 1923